Lisove is an urban-type settlement in Kropyvnytskyi Raion in the southeastern part of Kirovohrad Oblast, Ukraine. It belongs to Oleksandrivka settlement hromada, one of the hromadas of Ukraine. Population: .

Until 18 July 2020, Lisove belonged to Oleksandrivka Raion. The raion was abolished in July 2020 as part of the administrative reform of Ukraine, which reduced the number of raions of Kirovohrad Oblast to four. The area of Oleksandrivka Raion was merged into Kropyvnytskyi Raion.

Economy

Transportation
Lisove is connected by a road with Mykhailivka where it has access to roads leading to Kropyvnytskyi, Cherkasy, and Oleksandriia.

References

Urban-type settlements in Kropyvnytskyi Raion